The Philippines competed at the 2000 Summer Olympics in Sydney, Australia. This is the first time the Philippines failed to garner at least one medal in the Olympics since 1988.

Results by event

Archery

After a 12-year absence from Olympic archery, the Philippines sent one woman to the 2000 edition of the tournament.  She lost her first match.

Athletics

Men

Women

Key
Note–Ranks given for track events are within the athlete's heat only
Q = Qualified for the next round
q = Qualified for the next round as a fastest loser or, in field events, by position without achieving the qualifying target
NR = National record
N/A = Round not applicable for the event
Bye = Athlete not required to compete in round

Boxing

Diving
Men

Women

Equestrian

Jumping

Rowing

Shooting

Swimming
Men's 400m Freestyle
 Miguel Mendoza
 Preliminary Heat – 04:00.66 (did not advance)

Men's 1500m Freestyle 
 Juan Carlos Piccio
 Preliminary Heat – 15:51.57 (did not advance)

Men's 400m Individual Medley
 Juan Carlos Piccio
 Preliminary Heat – 04:30.17 (did not advance)

Women's 100m Breaststroke
 Jenny Rose Guerrero
 Preliminary Heat – 01:15.14 (did not advance)

Women's 200m Breaststroke
 Jenny Rose Guerrero
 Preliminary Heat – 02:38.10 (did not advance)

Women's 100m Backstroke
 Marie-Lizza Danila
 Preliminary Heat – 01:06.48 (did not advance)

Taekwondo

See also
 Philippines at the 2000 Summer Paralympics

References

Wallechinsky, David (2004). The Complete Book of the Summer Olympics (Athens 2004 Edition). Toronto, Canada. . 
International Olympic Committee (2001). The Results. Retrieved 12 November 2005.
Sydney Organising Committee for the Olympic Games (2001). Official Report of the XXVII Olympiad Volume 1: Preparing for the Games. Retrieved 20 November 2005.
Sydney Organising Committee for the Olympic Games (2001). Official Report of the XXVII Olympiad Volume 2: Celebrating the Games. Retrieved 20 November 2005.
Sydney Organising Committee for the Olympic Games (2001). The Results. Retrieved 20 November 2005.
International Olympic Committee Web Site

Nations at the 2000 Summer Olympics
2000 Summer Olympics
Summer Olympics